Jaylen is a given name.  Notable people with the name include:

Jaylen Adams (born 1996), American basketball player
Jaylen Bacon (born 1996), American track and field athlete
Jaylen Barford (born 1996), American basketball player
Jaylen Barron (born 1997), American actress
Jaylen Bland (born 1993), American basketball player
Jaylen Bond (born 1993), American basketball player
Jaylen Brown (born 1996), American basketball player
Jaylen Clark (born 2001), American basketball player
Jaylen Hands (born 1999), American basketball player
Jaylen Hill (born 1994), American football player
Jaylen Hoard (born 1999), French-American basketball player
Jaylen Johnson (born 1996), American basketball player
Jaylen Morris (born 1995), American basketball player
Jaylen Nowell (born 1999), American basketball player
Jaylen Robinson or Rob Stone (born 1995), American rapper
Jaylen Samuels (born 1996), American football player
Jaylen Smith (disambiguation), multiple people
Jaylen Sims (born 1998), American basketball player
Jaylen Twyman (born 1999), American football player
Jaylen Waddle (born 1998), American football player
Jaylen Warren (born 1998), American football player
Jaylen Watkins (born 1991), American football player
Jaylen Watson (born 1998), American football player

See also
Jalen, a page for the given name "Jalen"
 Jalon (disambiguation), a disambiguation page for "Jalon"
Jayden, a page for the given name "Jayden"